Drogheda Grammar School is an Irish co-educational multi-denominational school, located on Mornington Road, Drogheda, County Louth.

History 

Drogheda Grammar School was founded under Royal Charter in 1669 by Erasmus Smith and is one of the oldest secondary schools in Ireland. It was originally a boys’ boarding school but has now been a co-educational boarding and day school for over fifty years. 

It is owned by a company with charitable status called Drogheda Grammar School Ltd. This structure was set up in the early 1950s when a group of local people (mostly Quakers) saved the school from closure. Although the school is not a Quaker school, it is run under the Quaker principle of "every individual is of value and has something to contribute". This philosophy is fundamental to the Mission Statement of the school. 

It is located on 18 acres in a rural setting. The campus consists of a Regency house flanked by woodland, with classroom and dormitory buildings and playing fields.

Academic performance 

The most recent statistics outlining the top feeder schools in the country for third-level education placed Drogheda Grammar School as the top school in the area with 100% of its students progressing to 3rd level education in 2020 (as well as in 2015 and).  These results were posted in both the Irish Times and Irish Independent.

Campus 

Drogheda Grammar School is located on 18 acres in a rural setting off of Mornington Road, Drogheda, County Louth. The original building on its current campus was owned by Chief Justice Henry Singleton. The school opened a new building in 2012. This new building includes a library/writing centre, technology workshop, DCG room, and a Home Economics room. There is a small reflection room which has a stained glass window originally made in contribution to the memory of a student who died in 1942 by Harry Clarke Stained Glass Studio in the 1940s and was in storage since 1976 after the school was moved from Lawrence Street. The school has six tennis courts, five playing pitches, a large gymnasium, and an AstroTurf pitch.

Athletics 

The school participates in several team sports including hockey, rugby, football, basketball and netball.  The school also has a chess team and has won a number of local and all-Ireland competitions.

Past pupils 

 Balthazar Foster, 1st Baron Ilkeston (physician and Liberal MP)
 Arthur Wellesley, 1st Duke of Wellington (soldier and Prime Minister)
 Jackson Lawlor (Anglican priest and writer)
 Edward Moore (Bishop of Kilmore, Elphin and Ardagh)
 Sir Henry Cuthbert (lawyer and politician in Australia)
 Henry Grattan (politician)
 Henry Flood (politician)
 Robert Adrain (United Irishman and politician)
 John Cunningham (poet, dramatist and actor)
 Richard Lovell Edgeworth (politician, writer and inventor)
 John Edward Healy (longest serving editor of the Irish Times)
 Derek Landy (author and screenwriter)
 John Robert Leslie (Irish academic)
 Jill Meagher (Irish Australian homicide victim)
 Henry Singleton (Chief Justice of Ireland)
 Sir Oscar Daly ( Chief Justice of Barbados who swore Edward 8th in as Governor)
 George Forbes ( 3rd Earl of Granard and royal navy commander)
 John Kells Ingram (Irish mathematician, economist and writer)
 Deirdre Gogarty (Irish boxer)
 Courtney Love (American musician)
 Anneliese Durant (Famous Durant Sister) 
 Jonathan Kelly (Irish folk/rock singer and musician)
 Ally R Memon (academic and author)
 Alexander Williams (1846–1930, Irish painter, singer and taxidermist)

References

External links 

 Drogheda Grammar School website

1669 establishments in the British Empire
Boarding schools in Ireland
Private schools in the Republic of Ireland
Buildings and structures in Drogheda
Secondary schools in County Louth
Schools with a royal charter
Drogheda
Educational institutions established in the 1660s